1991 Pirveli Liga was the 2nd season of the Georgian Pirveli Liga. The Pirveli Liga is the second division of Georgian Football. It consists of reserve teams and professional teams.

League standings

Promotion/relegation playoffs 
Iveria Khashuri - Mretebi Tbilisi - 2-3 (aet)

See also
1991 Umaglesi Liga

Erovnuli Liga 2 seasons
2
Georgia